Edward Bierstone  (born ) is a Canadian mathematician at the University of Toronto who specializes in singularity theory, analytic geometry, and differential analysis.

Education and career
He received his B.Sc. from the University of Toronto and his Ph.D. at Brandeis University in 1972.  He was a visiting scholar at the Institute for Advanced Study in the summer of 1973.  He served as the Director of the Fields Institute from 2009 to 2013.

Recognition
Bierstone was elected a member of the Royal Society of Canada in 1992 and, together with Pierre Milman, received the Jefferey Williams Prize in 2005. In 2012 he became a fellow of the American Mathematical Society. In 2018 the Canadian Mathematical Society listed him in their inaugural class of fellows.

Notes

External links

 personal webpage

Living people
Canadian mathematicians
Fellows of the Canadian Mathematical Society
Fellows of the Royal Society of Canada
Academic staff of the University of Toronto
Institute for Advanced Study visiting scholars
Fellows of the American Mathematical Society
Year of birth missing (living people)